Zahra Bani (born 31 December 1979) is a Somali-born Italian javelin thrower.

Biography
Bani was born in 1979 in Mogadishu, the capital of Somalia, to an Italian father and a Somali mother. In 1989, she moved to Torino, Italy with her family and started playing volleyball. She soon thereafter discovered her specialty: javelin. Bani's personal best throw is 62.75 metres, achieved at the 2005 World Championships in Helsinki. However, since 2005, she has been suffering from health problems, which have significantly hampered her athletic performances. Bani ranks second on the all-time Italian list behind Claudia Coslovich.

Achievements

National titles
Bani won 17 national championships at individual senior level.

Italian Athletics Championships
Javelin throw: 2005, 2006, 2009, 2010, 2011, 2012, 2017, 2021 (8)
Italian Winter Throwing Championships
Javelin throw: 2006, 2008, 2009, 2010, 2011, 2012, 2013, 2015, 2017 (9)

See also
 Italian Athletics Championships - Multi winners
 Italian all-time lists - Javelin throw
 Italy at the European Throwing Cup
 Naturalized athletes of Italy
 Italian Somalians

Notes

References

External links
 

1979 births
Living people
Sportspeople from Mogadishu
Somalian javelin throwers
Italian female javelin throwers
Somalian female athletes
Olympic athletes of Italy
Athletes (track and field) at the 2008 Summer Olympics
World Athletics Championships athletes for Italy
Athletics competitors of Fiamme Azzurre
Naturalised citizens of Italy
Somalian people of Italian descent
Somalian emigrants to Italy
Italian sportspeople of African descent
Mediterranean Games silver medalists for Italy
Athletes (track and field) at the 2005 Mediterranean Games
Mediterranean Games medalists in athletics